Leo Trevena (1929-2013) was an Australian professional rugby league footballer who played in the 1950s, and coached in the 1960s and 1970s. He played for Canterbury-Bankstown and the Western Suburbs Magpies in the 1950s. He also coached the Penrith Panthers in their 1967 season and their 1973 season. He was the captain of Canterbury team in '54.

Playing career
Trevena played four seasons with Western Suburbs between 1950-1953. He played halfback in the 1950 Magpies team that were runners up in the premiership. He won a premiership with Western Suburbs in 1952 NSWRFL season.
He joined the Canterbury-Bankstown for one season in 1954 was their main captain throughout the season.

Coaching career
Trevena captain-coached Young to win the Clayton Cup in 1955.
He coached the Penrith Panthers in 1967 and 1973.

He retired to the Gold Coast in later life, and died there on 20 July 2013.

References

1929 births
2013 deaths
Australian rugby league coaches
Australian rugby league players
Canterbury-Bankstown Bulldogs captains
Canterbury-Bankstown Bulldogs players
Date of birth missing
Penrith Panthers coaches
Place of birth missing
Rugby league halfbacks
Western Suburbs Magpies players